Piranha is a digital imaging application produced by Interactive Effects, Inc. Its features include editing, compositing, conforming, color grading, 2D and 3D paint, and titling. Piranha has been used to produce imagery for feature films, TV shows, and electronic entertainment titles since its debut in the mid-1990s.

Release history

References

IRIX software